Salsnes is a village in the municipality of Namsos in Trøndelag county, Norway. It is located on the mainland of Fosnes on a small isthmus of land between the Foldafjord and the lake Salsvatnet. Salen Chapel is located in the village.

References

Villages in Trøndelag
Namsos